Neuve-Chapelle is a commune in the Pas-de-Calais department in the Hauts-de-France region of France. It was the site of a First World War battle in 1915.

Geography

History
The village gave its name to a battle of the First World War that began on 10 March 1915, and in which it was captured, not for the first time, by the IV and I Indian Corps. It was later adopted by the County Borough of Blackpool and was awarded the Croix de Guerre in 1922.

Population

Places of interest
 The church of St. Christophe, rebuilt, as was much of the commune, after World War I.
 The Commonwealth War Graves Commission cemeteries and memorials.
 The Neuve-Chapelle Indian Memorial of the British Indian Army.
 Finds from the battlefield, in the mairie.

See also
 Battle of Neuve Chapelle (1915)
Communes of the Pas-de-Calais department

References

External links

 Website about the battle of Neuve-Chapelle
 The CWGC Indian memorial
 Neuve-Chapelle Farm CWGC cemetery
 The CWGC British cemetery
 The war memorial 
 NB — All maplinks can be found by clicking on the coordinates link at the top of the page.

Neuvechapelle